The 2012 Kelly Cup Playoffs of the ECHL started on April 2, 2012 following the end of the 2011–12 ECHL regular season. The playoff format remains unchanged from that of the 2011 postseason. 15 teams qualified for the playoffs, being the top seven teams from the Western Conference and the top eight teams from the Eastern Conference.

Playoff format
In the Eastern Conference, postseason berths will be awarded to the first-place team in each division and the next five teams in the conference, based on points. The division winners will be seeded first, second and third and will play the eighth-place finisher, the seventh-place finisher and the sixth-place finisher, respectively, while the fourth-place finisher and the fifth-place finisher will meet. The conference semifinals will have the winner of the first-place and eighth-place matchup will meet the winner of the fourth-place and fifth-place game while the winner of the second-place and seventh-place game will face the winner of the third-place and sixth-place matchup.

In the Western Conference, postseason berths will be awarded to the first-place team in each division and the next five teams in the conference, based on points. The division winner with the best record in the conference will receive a bye in the first round. The other division winner will be seeded second and meet the team that finishes seventh in the conference in the first round. The other first round matchups will be the third-place finisher in the conference against the sixth-place finisher in the conference and the fourth-place finisher in the conference against the fifth-place finisher in the conference. The conference semifinals will have the first-place finisher meeting the winner of the fourth-place and fifth-place matchup and the winner of the second-place finisher and seventh-place finisher against the winner of the third-place finisher against the sixth-place finisher.

The first round in each Conference will be a best of five series with each subsequent round being a best of seven series.

Playoff seeds
After the regular season, 15 teams qualified for the playoffs. The Alaska Aces were the Western Conference regular season champions and the Brabham Cup winners with the best record at 97 points, making them the first team in league history to win the Brabham Cup in consecutive seasons. The Elmira Jackals earned the top seed in the Eastern Conference and finished the season with 95 points.

Eastern Conference
Elmira Jackals - Atlantic Division and Eastern Conference champions, 95 points.
Gwinnett Gladiators - South Division champions, 93 points.
Kalamazoo Wings - North Division champions, 84 points.
Greenville Road Warriors - 88 points.
Florida Everblades - 85 points.
Wheeling Nailers - 83 points.
South Carolina Stingrays - 81 points.
Reading Royals - 80 points.

Western Conference
Alaska Aces - Western Conference and Mountain Division champions, Brabham Cup winner, 97 points.
Ontario Reign - Pacific Division champions, 94 points.
Las Vegas Wranglers - 92 points.
Colorado Eagles - 82 points.
Stockton Thunder - 73 points.
Utah Grizzlies - 72 points.
Idaho Steelheads - 71 points.

Playoff bracket

Conference Quarterfinals 
Home team is listed first.

Eastern Conference

(1) Elmira Jackals vs. (8) Reading Royals

(2) Gwinnett Gladiators vs. (7) South Carolina Stingrays

(3) Kalamazoo Wings vs. (6) Wheeling Nailers

(4) Greenville Road Warriors vs. (5) Florida Everblades

Western Conference

(2) Ontario Reign vs. (7) Idaho Steelheads

(3) Las Vegas Wranglers vs. (6) Utah Grizzlies

(4) Colorado Eagles vs. (5) Stockton Thunder

Conference Semifinals 
Home team is listed first.

Eastern Conference

(1) Elmira Jackals vs. (5) Florida Everblades 

This was the second playoff meeting between the two franchises; Elmira defeated Florida 4-2 in the 2010 Eastern Conference Semifinals. During the regular season, Elmira defeated Florida 4-2, going 2-1 both in Elmira and in Florida. Florida's John Muse was injured in the second period of Game 2, resulting in Pat Nagle coming in for the third period to secure the shutout. Nagle would be Florida's goalie throughout the rest of the series.

(3) Kalamazoo Wings vs. (7) South Carolina Stingrays

Western Conference

(1) Alaska Aces vs. (5) Stockton Thunder

(3) Las Vegas Wranglers vs. (7) Idaho Steelheads 

This was the fifth postseason meeting between the two franchises. Idaho had won three of the prior series (semifinals in 2004 and 2007, and quarterfinals in 2011); Las Vegas' sole historical victory was in the 2006 semifinals. During the regular season, Las Vegas was 7-1-4 against Idaho (1 overtime loss and 3 shootout losses, with 1 win in shootout).

Conference Finals
Note: Home team is listed first.

Eastern Conference

(3) Kalamazoo Wings vs. (5) Florida Everblades 

This was Kalamazoo's second consecutive Conference Final, and Florida's fourth in the past nine seasons. Their previous meeting was in 2011, where Kalamazoo beat Florida 3-1 in the first round. During the regular season, Florida beat Kalamazoo 3-2, with one loss in overtime and one win and one loss in shootout. The series marked the return of John Muse from his lower-body injury (suffered in Game 3 against Elmira in the Conference Semifinals) in a 7-0 shutout at home for Game 3.

Western Conference

(1) Alaska Aces vs. (3) Las Vegas Wranglers 

This was the third playoff meeting between the two franchises; Alaska won in the 2006 West Division Finals, 4-2, and 2009 National Conference finals 4-0, while Las Vegas won the 2008 National Conference Semifinals 4-1, giving Alaska a historical 9-6 lead. It was the second consecutive Conference Final for Alaska, and their sixth in eight seasons, and the third Final for Las Vegas in five seasons. During the regular season, Las Vegas beat Alaska 5-4, with Alaska winning a game in shootout, and Las Vegas winning two shootout games.

Kelly Cup Finals

(3) Las Vegas Wranglers vs. (5) Florida Everblades 

This is the first playoff meeting between the two franchises, and the first time either has played the other since 2005. They have met 5 times during the regular season (once in 2003, twice in 2004, and twice in 2005), with Florida leading the series 4-1; Las Vegas's sole victory prior to Game 1 was a shutout at Florida in 2005. Game 1 was only the second time Florida played at the Orleans Arena. Florida's 7-2 victory in Game 2 marks the largest margin of defeat for Las Vegas during the 2012 Kelly Cup playoffs, and ties for the most points scored by a team in any game during the postseason (Florida also scored 7 points on Kalamazoo twice). The 3-game stand for Games 3, 4, and 5 were billed as pitting the Everblades 8-0 postseason home record against Las Vegas' 7-1 postseason away record. Game 3 marked the first home victory in a Kelly Cup final for Florida, and Game 5 saw the Everblades win the cup in front of a standing-room-only crowd.

Statistical leaders

Skaters

''GP = Games played; G = Goals; A = Assists; Pts = Points; +/– = Plus/minus; PIM = Penalty minutes

Goaltending

GP = Games played; W = Wins; L = Losses; SA = Shots against; GA = Goals against; GAA = Goals against average; SV% = Save percentage; SO = Shutouts; TOI = Time on ice (in minutes)

References

See also 
 2011–12 ECHL season
 List of ECHL seasons

Kelly Cup playoffs
2011–12 ECHL season